Division 1-A Rugby (formerly known as the College Premier Division) is the highest level of college rugby within the United States and is administered by USA Rugby.  Division 1-A rugby is modeled after NCAA athletic competitions, with the 67 D1-A rugby schools divided into eight conferences: East, Mid-South, Rocky Mountain, California, Big Ten, Liberty, Red River, and PAC.

The regular season sees all teams in the conference play one another, with the two top seeds qualifying for the playoffs. Playoffs are a single-elimination format, occurring each year in April and May, with the winner of D1-A declared the National Champion. Regular seasons for most conferences are played in the spring, although some cold-weather conferences, such as the Big Ten Universities, play their regular season in the fall.

The competition's first season was played during 2011 and consisted of teams from 31 schools from across the United States.  The first ever match of the competition was played on Friday March 4, the Arizona State Sun Devils hosted the Colorado Buffaloes at the Arizona State University Soccer Stadium in Tempe, Arizona.  The 2011 final was played at Rio Tinto Stadium, in Sandy, Utah, on the 21 May 2011.

D1-A Rugby secured sponsorships in 2012 with World Rugby Shop and Veloce.

Several players who have excelled in the top level competitions in college rugby have also represented their country as part of the United States national under-20 rugby union team or the All Americans rugby union team.

Formation

History of college rugby in the U.S.

A group of British Army officers organized a game of rugby against the students of McGill University (Montreal, Quebec, Canada) in 1865; the Canadians were so enamored of the game that they decided to continue to play football by the Rugby code.  In 1874 McGill organized two games of football against Harvard, one was played under Harvard's rules, the other being a game of rugby. After this game, the Harvard students also decided to adopt rugby, making them the first American institution to do so. Columbia, Princeton and Yale were persuaded by Harvard to play football according to the Rugby School code in 1876, these four colleges thus formed the Intercollegiate Football Association (IFA), an organization that eventually expanded to become the "Ivy League."  In fact, the governing body of all American intercollegiate varsity sports, the National Collegiate Athletic Association (NCAA) traces its roots to the IFA and is thus a product of rugby rather than any of the sports it now governs.

By 1886 the Yale coach Walter Camp had modified rugby's rules in order to solve the problem of tackled players lying on the ball by introducing a series of four downs to gain ten yards; ironically in the same year the Rugby Football Union in England solved the same problem by requiring that tackled players release the ball.  This is still one of the most fundamental differences between Rugby Union and American Football but one further modification, that of allowing one forward pass per down, was suggested by the Notre Dame coach Knute Rockne which, when accepted in 1905, gave rise to that distinctly American form of football.

Around the turn of the century American football was being frowned upon for its violence.  Publication of graphic photographs of a harsh game between Swarthmore College and the University of Pennsylvania caused a stir; President Theodore Roosevelt was forced to insist upon reform or abolition of the game.  During this period of uncertainty, rugby made a brief but important reappearance in many colleges, most notably at the University of California and at Stanford.  It was Stanford that supplied most of the players to the two US Olympic rugby teams, along with Santa Clara University and the University of California. (1920 & 1924) who claimed fame by winning both gold medals (as 1924 was the last time the Olympic Games staged a rugby competition, this made the USA the defending Olympic champions when rugby was re-introduced after almost a century at the 2016 Summer Olympics).

In 1934, there was only one official rugby body in the United States, the Eastern Rugby Union, with a total of 9 member teams.  By 1950, there were 30 clubs in the US, existing only in small pockets on the East and West Coasts.

It was not until the mid-1960s that rugby began to re-appear with regular fixtures and competitions; the game suited the mildly anarchistic temperament of American College students of the period; it required minimal costs for the individual, the style of the game provided constant action, there was an emphasis on enjoyment rather than winning because rugby was not part of the now rigidly institutionalized athletic system that American Universities had developed.  The formation of the United States of America Rugby Football Union (USARFU, now USA Rugby) in 1976 was a major organizational milestone for the sport in the US, and by 1980 there were over 1,000 clubs nationwide.

In 2011, there were 2,433 clubs in the United States with more than 88,000 registered players, approximately 40% of which are college players (about three-quarters being male and one quarter female).

Formation of Division 1-A

Prior to the formation of Division 1-A, there had been some difficulty in determining how many teams each territory would send to the Sweet 16 tournament, as the relative strengths of the rugby teams in each territory fluctuated over time, and despite the disparity in the levels of rugby, it was politically difficult to deny a union any playoff bids, even though the team that came third or fourth in a more powerful territory might be a better side.  Further problems occurred because of the different competitive seasons across the continent; in the East the league season is played in the fall while in the South and West spring is the primary season, so this structure was frequently open to criticism.

Because of these issues, and to raise the level of rugby in the consciousness of the American public, USA Rugby restructured Division 1 college rugby. In 2010, several of the top college teams agreed to form the College Premier League to begin play in spring 2011. USA Rugby and the top colleges believed that an elite level college rugby competition would make it easier to get college rugby onto TV and attract sponsors. USA Rugby also believed that a higher level college competition would develop players to potentially play for the U.S. national team.

The governance of collegiate rugby was split and diverged in 2021. National Collegiate Rugby (NCR), formerly NSCRO, emerged as a rival by expanding beyond small colleges to include the higher divisions.  The umbrella of the USA Rugby Collegiate Council includes College Rugby Association of America (CRAA), among several other organizations. In 2021, there were five men’s DIA conferences plus independents under USA Rugby/CRAA. Two men’s conferences that played DIA in 2019 joined NCR in 2021.

D1-A Championships

Collegiate Championships prior to D1-A Formation
The earliest claims to a national title go back to the mid-1960s when Sports Illustrated Magazine started demonstrating an interest in Collegiate rugby.  During the 1965-1966 season, the University of Notre Dame won several cups and tournaments and, in the absence of a bona fide national championship, Sports Illustrated named them unofficial Collegiate Rugby Champions.  The next year, under the authority of USARFU, Notre Dame played a match on April 8, 1967 against California at Memorial Stadium for the unofficial national championship, again as a result of both teams being highly rated by Sports Illustrated; Cal won 37-3.

The first official National Collegiate Championship series began in 1980.  Rugby in the United States is divided into territorial unions (the Mid-Atlantic, Midwest, Northeast, Pacific Coast, the South, Southern California and the West), each of these unions organise collegiate rugby into "Division One" and "Division Two" league competitions, generally with promotion and relegation between the divisions.  Between 1980 and 2010 each Territory qualified Division One and Two teams for the Sweet 16 of a D1 and D2 National championship.

California was dominant in Division One for the 31 years that the competition was run in this format, winning 28 titles, (26 in Division 1 & 2 in the Varsity Cup Championship). Air Force has won three titles; San Diego State and Brigham Young University have each won one D1 national championship but two in the Varsity Cup with one having been stripped.

Participants

East

Liberty

Mid-South

California

Rocky Mountain

Big Ten

Red River Conference

PAC

Independent

Rankings

Notes:
 Green shading indicates the highest-ranked team to debut in the rankings that year. Silver shading indicates the team that increased the largest number of places in the rankings that year. 
 2012: Cal was not included in the D1A rankings because it withdrew from D1A mid-season.
 2013: Utah was not ranked because its rugby program was suspended by the school. Central Florida, and Bowling Green were new to the rankings; they had been ranked #17 and #19 respectively in D1-AA during the previous 2012 season.
 2014: Army was ranked low, due in large part to the team's suspension during the season.

2011 season

Notable events 
 First Season of the College Premier Division
 Funding for Cal Rugby, which previously was announced would be dropped, was restored after additional funding was raised by donors, alumni and fans.
 Life University participated in its first playoff game in school history
 BYU hosted its first rugby playoff game in club history.
 BYU and California played for the national championship for the 6th consecutive year (2006-10 in USA Rugby Collegiate Tournament, 2011 USA Rugby College Premier Division)

Regular season
Records and final standings for 2011.

x-Conference champion  
y-Qualified for playoffs  
Gold = national champion  
Silver = national runner-up  
Bronze = national semifinalists

Playoffs and final

After the season
 Tennessee and LSU moved from D1-A to join other SEC schools in the newly formed D1-AA Southeastern Collegiate Rugby Conference.
 Dartmouth moved from D1-A to join other Ivy League schools in the newly formed D1-AA Ivy Rugby Conference.

2012 season

Regular season
Records and final standings for 2012.

x-Conference champion 
y-Qualified for playoffs

Playoffs and final

After the season
 Nine schools from the Big-10 joined Ohio State in D1-A and formed the Big Ten Universities conference.
 Texas A&M and Oklahoma were joined by several other Texas schools to form the Allied Rugby Conference, composed mostly of Big-12 South schools. 
 The Pacific Coast Conference was renamed the California Conference, several former D1-AA California schools were promoted to this conference, and Central Washington became an independent D1-A school.
 D1-AA champion Davenport was promoted to D1-A and joined the Mid-South Conference.
 UCLA, Utah, Arizona and Arizona State moved from their respective past conferences to the newly formed D1-A PAC Rugby Conference.
 BYU moved from Division 1A to the D1-AA Mountain States Conference; Navy moved from D1-A to the Atlantic Coast Rugby League; and Rutgers moved from D1-A to the Empire Rugby Conference.

2013 season

x = conference champion and automatic quarterfinal berth 
y = conference runner-up and eligible for playoffs 
z = conference champion and eligible for playoffs

Playoffs and final

After the season
 The following schools, either late during the spring 2013 season or after the season, left D1A and moved to the Varsity Cup: Central Washington, Texas, Oklahoma.
 The following schools joined D1A: Wheeling Jesuit, Lindenwood.

2014 season

Regular season

Playoffs and final

After the season
 The Allied Rugby Conference folded. Many of the schools went and formed the Red River Conference.

2015 season
For the 2014–2015 school year, a number of conferences — particularly those in the colder northeast and upper midwest — played their regular seasons in the fall.

Playoffs and final

2016 season

Playoffs

2017

Playoffs

After the season
The Varsity Cup folded in November 2017 when the organizer, broadcast partner and a major sponsor, Penn Mutual, withdrew their support.

2018

Standings

Playoffs

2019

Playoffs

2022

Standings

Playoffs

See also
 College rugby
 Collegiate Rugby Championship
 Varsity Cup Championship
 Intercollegiate sports team champions
 United States national under-20 rugby union team
 National Collegiate Rugby Championship results

Notes 

a.  There are also four independent State Unions (Alaska, Hawaii, Idaho and Montana).

References

External links
 

 
College rugby union competitions in the United States
Sports leagues established in 2011
2011 establishments in the United States